The 2001 Canadian Senior Curling Championships were held January 20 to 28 at the Calgary Curling Club in Calgary, Alberta.

Men's

Teams

Standings

Results

Draw 1

Draw 2

Draw 3

Draw 4

Draw 5

Draw 6

Draw 7

Draw 8

Draw 9

Draw 10

Draw 11

Draw 12

Draw 13

Draw 14

Draw 15

Draw 16

Draw 17

Tiebreakers

Tiebreaker #1

Tiebreaker #2

Playoffs

Semifinal

Final

Women's

Teams

Standings

Results

Draw 1

Draw 2

Draw 3

Draw 4

Draw 5

Draw 6

Draw 7

Draw 8

Draw 9

Draw 10

Draw 11

Draw 12

Draw 13

Draw 14

Draw 15

Draw 16

Draw 17

Playoffs

Tiebreaker #1

Tiebreaker #2

Semifinal

Final

External links
Men's statistics
Women's statistics

References

2001 in Canadian curling
Canadian Senior Curling Championships
2001 in Alberta
Curling competitions in Calgary
January 2001 sports events in Canada